Hemanth M. Rao is an Indian film director and screenwriter who works in Kannada cinema. He rose to fame following the success of his directorial debut Godhi Banna Sadharana Mykattu (2016).

Career
Rao took to films after completing his graduation in engineering and brief stint with journalism, in 2005. He worked as an assistant director with Girish Kasaravalli in the latter's 2008 film Gulabi Talkies, before working with Jacob Varghese in Savaari (2009) and Prithvi (2010).

He announced his directorial debut in 2013 with Love Churumuri -an youth centric romantic story told in IT background. However, the movie was shelved.

He made his directional debut in 2016 with Godhi Banna Sadharana Mykattu, that tells the story of a son who goes about searching for his missing 66-year-old father, that had Rakshit Shetty and Anant Nag playing the respective roles. The film was received well by audiences and critics alike.

Under his banner Lost & Found Films, he co-produced Humble Politician Nograj - a political satire comedy inspired by The Campaign.

He also won the Filmfare Award and National Film Award in 2019 jointly with other writers for his screenplay contribution to the 2018 Hindi movie Andhadhun.

His second directorial movie Kavaludaari was the maiden venture by actor Puneeth Rajkumar under his new home banner PRK Productions.  Kavaludaari won Best Movie in "Kannada Cinema Competition" at 12th Bengaluru International Film Festival 2020

Filmography

Awards and nominations

References

External links
 

Living people
Kannada film directors
Kannada screenwriters
Film directors from Bangalore
Screenwriters from Bangalore
Best Adapted Screenplay National Film Award winners
21st-century Indian film directors
1983 births